Hiberia is an alternate form of Iberia, and generally refers to the Iberian Peninsula in southwest Europe.

It may also refer to:
Hiberia, the wife of Ruricius, a Gallo-Roman aristocrat
Kingdom of Iberia (–580 AD), in the Caucasus region